Solariella intermedia is a species of sea snail, a marine gastropod mollusk in the family Solariellidae.

Distribution
This marine species occurs in circum-arctic waters.

References

 Leche, Kongl. Sw. Vetensk. Akademiens Handlingar, xvi, p. 40. 1878

External links
 To Encyclopedia of Life
 To ITIS
 To World Register of Marine Species
 

intermedia
Gastropods described in 1878